Carrigan is a rural locality of Narromine Shire and it is a civil parish of County of Ewenmar
Carrigan is on the Macquarie River east of Warren, New South Wales.

References

Localities in New South Wales
Geography of New South Wales
Central West (New South Wales)